The Parliament of the Democratic Republic of the Congo consists of two chambers:

The Senate (Upper Chamber)
The National Assembly (Lower Chamber)

The most recent Parliament was inaugurated on January 28, 2019.

History

By 28 May 2021, 32 members of the DRC parliament, making up 5% of the MPs, died due to COVID-19 during the COVID-19 pandemic in the Democratic Republic of the Congo.

See also

Politics of the Democratic Republic of the Congo
List of legislatures by country

References

External links

Parlement de la Republique Democratique du Congo, Official Site
National Assembly
Senate

Politics of the Democratic Republic of the Congo
Political organisations based in the Democratic Republic of the Congo
Government of the Democratic Republic of the Congo
Congo, Democratic Republic
Congo, Democratic Republic
Bicameral legislatures